The Debenham Baronetcy, of Bladen in the County of Dorset, is a title in the Baronetage of the United Kingdom. It was created on 28 January 1931 for Ernest Debenham, Chairman of Debenhams Ltd.

As of 2014 the present baronet has not proved his succession and does not appear on the Official Roll of the Baronets. The Baronetcy has been considered dormant since 2001.

Debenham baronets, of Bladen (1931)
Sir Ernest Ridley Debenham, 1st Baronet (1865–1952)
Sir Piers Kenrick Debenham, 2nd Baronet (1904–1964)
Sir Gilbert Ridley Debenham, 3rd Baronet (1906–2001)
Sir Thomas Adam Debenham, 4th Baronet (born 1971)

The heir presumptive to the baronetcy is Oliver William Debenham (born 1976).  He is a first cousin of the present Baronet.

Notes

References
Kidd, Charles, Williamson, David (editors). Debrett's Peerage and Baronetage (1990 edition). New York: St Martin's Press, 1990, 

Debenham
Debenham family